A legendary creature from Welsh tradition depicted as  very large and intelligent birds, often considered to be related to the griffin,

Lore
The Adar Llwch Gwin were given to a warrior named Drudwas ap Tryffin by his fairy wife. The name derives from the Welsh words adar ("bird"), llwch ("dust"), and gwin ("wine"). These birds were said to understand human speech and to obey whatever command was given to them by their master. However, when Drudwas was about to do battle with the hero Arthur he commanded them to kill the first man to enter the battle. Arthur himself was delayed and the birds ultimately turned on Drudwas when he walked onto the battlefield first, tearing him to pieces.   Later, in medieval Welsh poetry, the phrase Adar Llwch Gwin came to describe all types of raptors including hawks, falcons, and brave men.

References

John & Caitlin Matthews (2005). The Element Encyclopedia of Magical Creatures. HarperElement

A WELSH CLASSICAL DICTIONARY. DRUDWAS ap TRYFFIN

Welsh legendary creatures
Legendary birds

External links
 "Welsh Classical Dictionary"